TLG may refer to:

The Leaders Globe Media, a publication Business Magazine
Tea Leaf Green, a band
 The Lego Group, a company that manufactures LEGO toys
 The Lion Guard,a TV series
 The Little Gym, an international franchise of children's gyms
 The Livingston Group, a lobbying firm based in Washington, D.C.
 The Lying Game (TV series), a TV series
 Thesaurus Linguae Graecae, a research centre at the University of California
 Tiger Leaping Gorge, a canyon in China
 Top Level Group, a parliamentary group in the United Kingdom
 Trilegiant Corporation, a subsidiary of the Affinion Group
 Troll Lord Games, a publisher of games